NGC 3862 is an elliptical galaxy located 300 million light-years away in the constellation Leo. Discovered by astronomer William Herschel on April 27, 1785, NGC 3862 is an outlying member of the Leo Cluster.

The galaxy is classified as a FR I radio galaxy and as a Head-tail radio galaxy. It hosts a supermassive black hole that is blasting a jet of plasma that is moving at 98 percent of the speed of light and is one of the few jets that can be seen in visible light.

Jet
Observations made by Bridle et al. in 1981 using maps made with the VLA revealed a jet-like structure emerging from the nucleus of NGC 3862. In late January 1992, the Hubble Space Telescope observed NGC 3862 with the Faint Object Spectrograph and confirmed the presence of an optical jet in the nucleus of NGC 3862.

At a distance of  the jet starts to abruptly expand and becomes turbulent. At this distance, filaments and pronounced kinks can be observed which suggests that the jet is oscillating or evolving a helical structure. This suggests that the jet is interacting with the dust ring and becomes less collimated. However, Perlman et al. suggests that the disk and the jet occupy physically distinct regions of the galaxy and therefore are not interacting.

The total amount of energy produced by the jet is estimated to be around 3.71 × 1042 ergs.

Knots
The jet of NGC 3862 contains four faint knots of material designated in increasing order from the nucleus: Knot A, B, C and D. The knots exhibit a structure similar to that of a string of pearls.

Radio morphology
NGC 3862 contains a Head-tail radio morphology with two tails that extend . This morphology appears to be the result of the galaxy interacting with the intracluster medium (ICM).

Nucleus
However, as the jet of galaxy has been suggested to lie at angle of 50° to Earth's line of sight, the dust disk must be puffed up in order for the jet to have been disturbed by the disk. The emission of CO in the nucleus exhibits a double-horned line profile which suggests that the dust disk is rotating. The inferred distribution of the CO is consistent with the observed dust disk and the presence of the molecular gas suggests that the gas originated from either a merger with two gas-rich galaxies a few billion years ago or from cannibalism of smaller gas-rich galaxies.

Hutchings et al. proposed instead that the apparent disk represents an evacuated region cleared of dust by some nuclear related process or by the jet itself as indicated by the color of the region inside the ring being similar to the color of the galaxy spectrum. Lara et al. also suggested this as the jet appears to widen within the apparent ring which would be consistent with an explanation of a favored expansion of the jet due to the lower density medium within the evacuated region or bubble.

Supermassive black hole
NGC 3862 contains a supermassive black hole with an estimated mass of  M☉.

The black hole is responsible for producing the jet of plasma that is moving at nearly the speed of light.

Companion galaxies
NGC 3862 has an elliptical or a lenticular companion galaxy known as IC 2955.

See also 
 3C 273 – famous quasar with optical jet
 List of NGC objects (3001–4000)
 Messier 87 – nearby giant elliptical galaxy with optical jet 
 NGC 3842 – giant elliptical galaxy in the center of the Leo Cluster

References

External links

036606
3862
Elliptical galaxies
Leo (constellation)
Radio galaxies
06723
Leo Cluster
Astronomical objects discovered in 1785
264
+19.40